Shivlya is a village in the Lerik Rayon of Azerbaijan. With a cold climate all year round, Shivlya has become known as "The Shivering Village".

References 

Populated places in Lerik District